Çərəkə (also, Cherakya, Chereke, and Gäräkä) is a village and municipality in the Goychay Rayon of Azerbaijan.  It has a population of 3,840.

References 

Populated places in Goychay District